Muslim Senior Secondary School is a school in Banjul, the Gambia. It was formerly known as the Muslim High School. Its alumni includes Adama Barrow, the 3rd President of the Gambia.

History 
The Gambia Muslim Association (GMA), under the leadership of medical doctor and diplomat Ebrahim M. Samba (he later was appointed Honorary Life Chairman of the Board of Governors) saw the need for a school for Muslim youths in the Gambia who could not gain admission to the then-missionary schools. Originally, in 1966, they began a madrasa hosted at the Muhammadan Primary School, Banjul. However, in 1975, the Muslim High School was founded.

In 1995, the name was changed to the Muslim Senior Secondary School, as required by a new education policy brought in by the Armed Forces Provisional Ruling Council. Alhagie Sheikh Adama Joof served as the school's first principal. The school is currently located in an area of Banjul called Half-Die, in close proximity to the Banjul Dockyards. It is a government grant-aided school and is overseen by a Board of Governors. It is co-educational and provides an English 'section' to grades 10, 11 and 12, and an Arabic 'section' from grades 1 to 12. The school's current principal is Lamin K. Marong, who in 2009 was also elected as President of the Gambia Teachers' Union (GTU).

Alumni 
 Adama Barrow, 3rd President of the Gambia
 Lamin Kaba Bajo, former politician and President of the Gambia Football Federation
 Ansumana Dibba, Director of the Africa Response and Development Organisation (ARRDO)
 Sheikh Omar Faye, former Gambian Ambassador to the United States (tutor at the school from 1981 to 1983)
 Yankuba Touray, politician and former army officer

Foday L. Camara current Contract Manager at Department of Defense is an Alumni of Muslim High School

References

External links
 Muslim Senior Secondary School

Buildings and structures in Banjul
1970s establishments in the Gambia
High schools and secondary schools in the Gambia
Gambia